Battle of Tonlé Sap (French: Bataille de Tonlé Sap) was a battle between Champa and Khmer Empire in 1177.


Prologue
The 12th century was a time of conflict and brutal power struggles. Under Suryavarman II (reigned 1113–1150) the Khmer kingdom united internally and the largest temple of Angkor was built in a period of 37 years: Angkor Wat, dedicated to the god Vishnu.  In the east, his campaigns against Champa, and Annam, were unsuccessful, though he did sack Vijaya in 1145 and depose Jaya Indravarman III. The Khmers occupied Vijaya until 1149, when they were driven out by Jaya Harivarman I. Suryavarman II sent a mission to the Chola dynasty of south India and presented a precious stone to the Chola Emperor Kulothunga Chola I in 1114.

Another period followed in which kings reigned briefly and were violently overthrown by their successors. Finally in 1177 the Angkor capital was raided and looted in a naval battle on the Tonlé Sap lake by a Cham fleet under Jaya Indravarman IV king of Champa. Then Tribhuvanadityavarman king of Angkor was killed.

See also

 Khmer–Cham wars
 Po Klong Garai
 Tribhuvanadityavarman
 Bayon

References

Citations

Bibliography
 
 

 
  
  
  

Po Klong Garai
Khmer Empire
History of Champa